Typha przewalskii is a plant species native to the Manchuria Region of northeastern China (Provinces of Heilongjiang, Jilin, Liaoning) and also to the Primorye region in the Russian Far East. The plant grows in freshwater marshes and along the banks of lakes and streams.

References

przewalskii
Freshwater plants
Flora of Russia
Flora of Liaoning
Flora of Heilongjiang
Flora of Jilin
Plants described in 1943